In the mathematical discipline of idempotent analysis, tropical analysis is the study of the tropical semiring.

Applications 
The max tropical semiring can be used appropriately to determine marking times within a given Petri net and a vector filled with marking state at the beginning:  (unit for max, tropical addition) means "never before", while 0 (unit for addition, tropical multiplication) is "no additional time".

Tropical cryptography is cryptography based on the tropical semiring.

Tropical geometry is an analog to algebraic geometry, using the tropical semiring.

References

Further reading

See also
Lunar arithmetic

External links 
 MaxPlus algebra
 Max Plus working group, INRIA Rocquencourt

 
Tropical geometry